Cholbon (Çolbon) is a rural locality (a selo) in Yansky Rural Okrug of Verkhoyansky District in the Sakha Republic, Russia, located  from Batagay, the administrative center of the district, and  from Yuttyakh, the administrative center of the rural okrug. Its population as of the 2010 Census was 5; down from 19 recorded in the 2002 Census.

References

Notes

Sources
Official website of the Sakha Republic. Registry of the Administrative-Territorial Divisions of the Sakha Republic. Verkhoyansky District. 

Rural localities in Verkhoyansky District